A by-election for the seat of Wanguri in the Northern Territory Legislative Assembly was held on 31 July 1999. The by-election was triggered by the resignation of Labor (ALP) member John Bailey. The seat had been held by Bailey since winning a previous by-election in 1989.

The ALP selected Paul Henderson, a computer analyst, as its candidate. The CLP candidate was Maisie Austin.

Results

References

1999 elections in Australia
Northern Territory by-elections
1990s in the Northern Territory